Clitennestra, an opera in a prelude and two acts, was the last work by Ildebrando Pizzetti. The libretto is in Italian. The opera play is based on ancient Greek mythology written by Aeschylus and Sophocles. It was premiered at La Scala in Milan on 1 March 1965, conducted by Gianandrea Gavazzeni.

Roles

Synopsis 
On his return from the Trojan war, Agamennone was murdered by his wife Clitennestra, she claims, to punish him for sacrificing their daughter Iphigenia, but in reality to be with her lover, Egisto.

Seven years later, Clitennestra was killed by her son Oreste, who had been turned away as a child and returned incognito (bringing the false news of his  death) to avenge his father. Oreste, with the help of his sister Elettra, kills Clitennestra and Egisto, then goes into exile to punish himself for the crime committed, abandoning Elettra in despair.

Recordings

References

Operas by Ildebrando Pizzetti
Italian-language operas
1965 operas
Operas
Opera world premieres at La Scala
Operas based on Agamemnon (Aeschylus play)
Operas based on works by Sophocles
Agamemnon
Works based on The Libation Bearers
Works based on The Eumenides